The Port Adelaide Football Club was founded in late April or early May 1870. The club played its first game against a side called 'The Young Australians' in 1870 at Glanville hall Estate. In 1877 Port Adelaide joined seven other local clubs and formed the South Australian Football Association, the first organisation of its type in Australia. From 1877 to 1996 Port Adelaide won 4 Championships of Australia, 34 SANFL premierships and 1 wartime SANFL premiership as a merged club with West Torrens. In 1990 the club approached the newly named AFL for entry but was eventually beaten by a composite proposal, the Adelaide Crows, by the SANFL. The AFL guaranteed Port Adelaide a place in the competition in 1994 and eventually entered in 1997.

SANFL era players (1877–1996)
In 1877 Port Adelaide joined seven other local clubs and formed the South Australian Football Association, the first organisation of its type in Australia. In 1994, the AFL announced it would award a second AFL licence to a South Australian club. However a licence did not guarantee entry and although a target year of 1996 was set, this was reliant upon an existing AFL club folding or merging with another. In 1996, the cash-strapped Fitzroy announced it would merge with the Brisbane Bears to form the Brisbane Lions. A spot had finally opened and it was announced that in 1997, one year later than expected, Port Adelaide would enter the AFL.
 Legend
- SANFL premiership player

 - SANFL captain

 - Championship of Australia team member (1880, 1910, 1913, 1914).

Foundation era players (1870–1876) 
The Port Adelaide Football Club was established in late April or early May 1870[6] as part of a joint Australian football and cricket club. The football club played its first match against a team called the "Young Australians" on 30 July 1870 at North Park Lands. Football in South Australia at this stage was yet to be organised and there were several sets of rules in use across the state.

 - Club captain

References

"Every player who has played in the SANFL – The list" SA Footy. Retrieved 2015-02-02.

Players (before 1997)

Adelaide-related lists
Australian rules football-related lists